In Greek mythology, Euryganeia (Eurygáneia) was a Theban queen.

Family 
Euryganeia was either a daughter of Hyperphas, and thus, sister to Euryanassa. In some sources, she was described as Jocasta's sister, which would make her Oedipus' aunt. Euryganeia was occasionally named as Oedipus' second wife and the mother of his children, Polynices, Eteocles, Ismene and Antigone.  According to Pausanias, the statement at Odyssey 11.274—that the gods soon made the incestuous marriage between Oedipus and his mother Jocasta known—is incompatible with her bearing four children to him. The geographer cites the Oedipodeia as evidence for the fact that Euryganeia was actually the mother of Oedipus' brood. Pherecydes, on the other hand, attributed two sons (named Phrastor and Laonytus) to the marriage of Jocasta and Oedipus, but agreed that the more famous foursome were the children of Euryganeia.

Mythology 
There was a painting of Euryganeia at Plataea in which she was depicted as mournful because of the strife between her children. Following Euryganeia's death, Oedipus married Astymedusa, who plotted against her stepsons.

See also
List of Greek mythological figures

Notes

References 

 Pausanias, Description of Greece with an English Translation by W.H.S. Jones, Litt.D., and H.A. Ormerod, M.A., in 4 Volumes. Cambridge, MA, Harvard University Press; London, William Heinemann Ltd. 1918. . Online version at the Perseus Digital Library
 Pausanias, Graeciae Descriptio. 3 vols. Leipzig, Teubner. 1903.  Greek text available at the Perseus Digital Library.
 Pseudo-Apollodorus, The Library with an English Translation by Sir James George Frazer, F.B.A., F.R.S. in 2 Volumes, Cambridge, MA, Harvard University Press; London, William Heinemann Ltd. 1921. . Online version at the Perseus Digital Library. Greek text available from the same website.

Bibliography
.
.

Women in Greek mythology

Characters in Greek mythology